Chloramine-T is the organic compound with the formula CH3C6H4SO2NClNa.  Both the anhydrous salt and its trihydrate are known. Both are white powders. Chloramine-T is used as a reagent in organic synthesis. It is commonly used as cyclizing agent in the synthesis of aziridine, oxadiazole, isoxazole and pyrazoles. It's a inexpensive, low toxic and mild oxidizing agent, and it also acts as a source of nitrogen anions and electrophilic cations. But it may undergo degradation on long term exposure to atmosphere, so care must be taken during the storage.

Reactions
Chloramine-T contains active (electrophilic) chlorine.  Its reactivity is similar to that of sodium hypochlorite. Aqueous solutions of chloramine-T are slightly basic (pH typically 8.5). The pKa of the closely related N-chlorophenylsulfonamide C6H5SO2NClH is 9.5.

It is prepared by oxidation of toluenesulfonamide with sodium hypochlorite, with the latter being produced in situ from sodium hydroxide and chlorine (Cl2):

Uses

Reagent in amidohydroxylation
The Sharpless oxyamination converts an alkene to a vicinal aminoalcohol.  A common source of the amido component of this reaction is chloramine-T. Vicinal aminoalcohols are important products in organic synthesis and recurring pharmacophores in drug discovery.

Oxidant
Chloramine-T is a strong oxidant. It oxidizes hydrogen sulfide to sulfur and mustard gas to yield a harmless crystalline sulfimide.

It converts iodide to iodine monochloride (ICl). ICl rapidly undergoes electrophilic substitution predominantly with activated aromatic rings, such as those of the amino acid tyrosine. Thus, chloramine-T is used to incorporate iodine into peptides and proteins. Chloramine-T together with iodogen or lactoperoxidase is commonly used for labeling peptides and proteins with radioiodine isotopes.

Certifications
EN 1276  Bactericidal
 EN 13713 Bactericidal
 EN 14675 Virucidal
 EN 14476 Virucidal Norovirus
 EN 1650  Fungicidal
 EN 13704 Sporicidal Clostridium difficile

References

External links
 
 Chemicalland21.com: Chloramine T (Tosylchloramide sodium)
 InChem.org: Chloramine T
 

Antiseptics
Pesticides
Sulfonamides
Organochlorides
Organic sodium salts
p-Tosyl compounds
Nitrogen–halogen compounds
Sulfur–nitrogen compounds